This article details the Bradford Bulls rugby league football club's 1997 season, the 2nd season of the Super League era.

Season review

February 1997

Bradford started off their 1997 season with an emphatic 62–10 win over Hunslet Hawks in the 4th Round of the Challenge Cup. The Bulls continued their Challenge Cup run with a 34–12 win against London Broncos.

March 1997

The Bulls progressed through to the Challenge Cup semi-final with a 38–12 win in the quarter-final against Oldham Bears. Bradford kicked off their Super League II campaign with a 58–12 win against Warrington Wolves. Bradford once again reached the Challenge Cup Final for the 2nd year in a row and similar to last year they beat arch rivals Leeds Rhinos to get there; in a tight game the Bulls were 24–10 victors.

April 1997

April started off with a 38–12 win against Castleford Tigers keeping the Bulls at the top of the table. A last minute drop goal from Steve McNamara ensure that the Bulls beat London Broncos 19–14. Bradford then travelled to Central Park to play the Premiership Champions Wigan Warriors, a game which Paul Cook's 100% goal kicking ensure the Bulls stayed top of the table with a 22–18 win. Bradford continued their unbeaten run with a 30–18 win in Paris. The Bulls unbeaten run was nearly broken with a spirited display from Halifax Blue Sox however Bradford managed to hang onto a 28–26 lead to win the match. Bradford finished April off by hammering Sheffield Eagles 54–10.

May 1997

The Bulls were beaten in the Challenge Cup Final by St. Helens for the 2nd time in 2 years as they succumbed to a 32–22 defeat, this also marked the Bulls 1st loss of the season. Bradford didn't have to wait long for another crack at the Saints as they play at the home of the Bulls the week after the cup final however this time it was Bradford who took the points in revenge of the final defeat by beating the Saints 38–18. The Bulls continued their unbeaten streak in the league with two more wins in May, the first being a 38–14 victory against Warrington Wolves and the second being a 42–28 decimation of Oldham Bears. The final game in May saw the Bulls take on Halifax Blue Sox at Thrum Hall, Bradford found themselves behind 26–6 before going on to win 30–26 making it one of the best comebacks in the Super League era.

June 1997

Next up for the Bulls were the newest team in the Super League, the Salford City Reds. Salford put up a good battle but were no match for the Challenge Cup runners up who won 40–24. Bradford continued their unbeaten league start at rivals Leeds Rhinos in front of a 19,137 crowd, they beat the Rhinos 32–16 and increased their lead at the top of the table. In June the Bulls also participated in the World Club Challenge tournament, first up was the visit of Penrith Panthers, Bradford got off to a great start leading 16–6 at halftime but the Panthers came back to clinch the game 20–16. Bradford also lost their next two WCC games, a 20–16 loss to Auckland Warriors and a 30–10 loss to Cronulla Sharks.

July 1997

July started off with a hard fought 34–20 win against Castleford Tigers to keep their unbeaten league run intact. The Bulls made it 16 wins out of 16 games with a 38–20 effort against Challenge Cup winners St. Helens. Bradford once again beat newcomers Salford City Reds 34–14 to stay top of the league. The WCC got even worse for the Bulls as they lost 64–14 to Auckland Warriors in the return fixture and also lost 54–14 to Penrith Panthers.

August 1997

Bradford faced off against arch-rivals Leeds Rhinos at Odsal in a game which the Bulls were victors beating Leeds 22–8. The month got better as they dispatched Sheffield Eagles 32–12 and Paris St Germain 68–0 which took their winning streak in the league to 20 games. This unbeaten run ended in Round 21 when Wigan Warriors comfortably beat Bradford 33–18, then the week after the Bulls lost 28–24 against 2nd placed London Broncos. These results however did not affect the Bulls' finishing positions and they finished top of the table becoming the champions of Super League II. The Bulls played their final group game in the WCC losing 40–12 against Cronulla Sharks.

September 1997

The Bulls finished off the 1997 English season with a 25–12 loss to Castleford Tigers in the Premiership Trophy Quarter-final loss.

October 1997

Bradford had one more game of the season. The quarter final of the World Club Challenge against Auckland Warriors. The Bulls were only losing 20–16 at halftime but a great second half from Auckland blew Bradford away and the Bulls lost 62–14. The entire tournament was branded as a poor showing as no British teams qualified for the semi-finals.

1997 milestones

CCR4: Danny Peacock and Warren Jowitt scored their 1st tries for the Bulls.
CCQF: Steve McNamara reached 200 points and kicked his 100th goal for the Bulls.
CCQF: Robbie Paul scored his 25th try and reached 100 points for the Bulls.
Round 1: Robbie Paul scored his 4th hat-trick for the Bulls.
Round 3: Simon Knox scored his 1st hat-trick for the Bulls.
Round 8: Paul Anderson and Abi Ekoku scored their 1st tries for the Bulls.
Round 9: Mike Forshaw scored his 1st try for the Bulls.
Round 11: Jeff Wittenberg scored his 1st try for the Bulls.
Round 14: Nathan Graham and Andy Hodgson scored their 1st tries for the Bulls.
Round 15: Jon Scales scored his 25th try and reached 100 points for the Bulls.
Round 17: Steve McNamara reached 400 points for the Bulls.
Round 17: Paul Loughlin reached 100 points for the Bulls.
Round 20: James Lowes scored his 25th try and reached 100 points for the Bulls.
Round 20: Danny Peacock scored his 1st hat-trick for the Bulls.
Round 20: Kevin Crouthers scored his 1st try for the Bulls.
Round 22: Steve McNamara kicked his 200th goal for the Bulls.
WCC Game 3: Paul Loughlin scored his 25th try for the Bulls.
WCC Game 5: Andy Hodgson kicked his 1st goal for the Bulls.
WCC Game 6: Graeme Bradley scored his 25th try and reached 100 points for the Bulls.

Table

1997 fixtures and results

1997 Stones Bitter Super League

Challenge Cup

World Club Challenge

1997 squad statistics

Statistics include appearances and points in the Super League, Premiership, Challenge Cup and World Club Challenge.

References

External links
Bradford Bulls Website
Bradford Bulls in T&A
Bradford Bulls on Sky Sports
Bradford on Super League Site
Red,Black And Amber
BBC Sport-Rugby League 

Bradford Bulls seasons
Bradford Bulls